Live Exposure is a video by Little River Band, filmed at a live concert at The Summit in Houston, Texas on 7 October 1981.

Live Exposure was first released on VHS in 1981, and subsequently released on DVD in 2008

Track listing 
"It's A Long Way There" – Goble (from the album Little River Band)
"Man On Your Mind" – Shorrock/Tolhurst (Time Exposure)
"Mistress Of Mine" – Goble (First Under the Wire)
"Happy Anniversary" – Birtles/Briggs (Diamantina Cocktail)
"Don't Let The Needle Win" – Briggs (Time Exposure)
"Reminiscing" – Goble (Sleeper Catcher)
"Ballerina" – Birtles/Goble (Time Exposure)
"Cool Change" – Shorrock (First Under the Wire)
"The Night Owls" – Goble (Time Exposure)
"Help Is on Its Way" – Shorrock (Diamantina Cocktail)
"Lonesome Loser" – Briggs ([First Under the Wire)
"It's Not A Wonder" – Goble (First Under the Wire)
"Lady" – Goble (Sleeper Catcher)
"Just Say That You Love Me" – Goble (Time Exposure)

Personnel 

Little River Band
Glenn Shorrock – lead vocal 
Graeham Goble – harmony vocals, acoustic and electric guitars 
Beeb Birtles – lead and harmony vocals, acoustic and electric guitars 
Derek Pellicci – drums 
Wayne Nelson – bass, lead and harmony vocals 
Stephen Housden – lead guitar 
Mal Logan – keyboards

Charts

Reviews
Fulvue Drive-in

References

External links 
 

1981 films
Capitol Records video albums
EMI Records video albums
Little River Band albums